The Stangeland stone or N 239 is a Viking Age runestone engraved in Old Norse with the Younger Futhark runic alphabet in Stangeland, Norway,  and the style of the runestone is the runestone style RAK. It was found on Stangeland Farm, where it has been moved several times and for many years was used as a bridge over a river.

Inscription
Transliteration of the runes into Latin characters

 þur(b)(i)(u)(r)(n) : skalt : ra(i)sti s(t)n (þ)(o)n(a) aft : s(o)i-÷þuri : sun : sin : is o : (t)on(m)arku (f)il

Old Norse transcription:

 

English translation:

 "Þorbjôrn Skald raised this stone in memory of <soi->þórir, his son, who fell in Denmark."

References

Runestones in Norway
Runestones in memory of Viking warriors